Kurash competition at the 2016 Asian Beach Games was held in Da Nang, Vietnam from 25 to 27 September 2016 at Biển Đông Park.

Medalists

Men

Women

Medal table

Results

Men

60 kg
25 September

66 kg
26 September

73 kg
26 September

81 kg
27 September

90 kg
27 September

Women

48 kg
25 September

52 kg
25 September

57 kg
26 September

63 kg
27 September

70 kg
27 September

References

External links 
 

2016 Asian Beach Games events